Huntington Hardisty (February 3, 1929 – October 1, 2003) was a United States Navy four star admiral who served as Vice Chief of Naval Operations (VCNO) from 1987 to 1988; and Commander in Chief, United States Pacific Command (USCINCPAC) from 1988 to 1991.

Hardisty was offered a Major League Baseball contract with the Chicago Cubs but opted for a scholarship to the University of North Carolina. He later transferred to the United States Naval Academy where he played football.

After graduation in 1952, he attended pilot training and earned his wings in 1953.

As a test pilot in 1961, he set a low level speed record in an F4H-1 Phantom II of 900 miles per hour at 125 feet above the ground, a record which remained unbroken for 16 years. The actual F4H-1 'Sageburner' is now in storage at the National Air and Space Museum in Washington D.C.

His assignments included command of Carrier Air Wing Eleven, USS Savannah (AOR-4) and USS Oriskany (CVA-34). As a flag officer he was President of the Naval War College, commanded the U.S. Naval Base Subic Bay in the Philippines; commanded Carrier Strike Force Seventh Fleet; and served as Director for Operations, Office of the Joint Chiefs of Staff; Deputy and Chief of Staff, United States Pacific Command; Vice Chief of Naval Operations; and Commander in Chief, United States Pacific Command. He also received the Gray Eagle Award.

He was one of the technical directors for the movie Hunt for Red October.

After retiring from the Navy in 1991, he was a board member of several corporations and served as president of Kaman Aerospace International in Connecticut. He belonged to numerous organizations, including the Association of Naval Aviation, and served as chairman of the U.S. Naval Academy Alumni Association.

Admiral Hardisty died on October 1, 2003 in Hartford, Connecticut at the age of 74. He was later interred on December 5, 2003, in Arlington National Cemetery.

Awards and decorations

References 

1929 births
2003 deaths
United States Navy admirals
United States Naval Academy alumni
United States Navy personnel of the Vietnam War
United States Naval Aviators
Burials at Arlington National Cemetery
Presidents of the Naval War College
Vice Chiefs of Naval Operations
Recipients of the Legion of Merit
Recipients of the Silver Star
Recipients of the Distinguished Flying Cross (United States)
Recipients of the Distinguished Service Order (Vietnam)
20th-century American academics